Chaubari is a village in Amalner Tehsil, Jalgaon district. Chaubari is 12 km from Amalner on Amalner-Shindkheda Road.

Chaubari's near village is jaitphir. Jaitphir is 1km from chaubari.

References 

Villages in Jalgaon district